Barry Hill is an Australian historian, writer, and academic. He has written poetry, fiction, non-fiction, and libretti. He is known for his biography of anthropologist Ted Strehlow, called Broken Song: T G H Strehlow and Aboriginal Possession, published in 2002.

Early life and education
Hill was born in Melbourne.

He studied at the University of Melbourne, gaining his Bachelor of Arts (BA), Bachelor of Education (BEd) and a Doctor of Philosophy (PhD) and from there went to London, where he gained his Master of Arts (MA) degree from the University of London.

Writing career
Hill has worked in both Melbourne and London.  In London he worked for the Times Literary Supplement.

In 1975 Hill became a full-time writer.  he was poetry editor of The Australian newspaper.

Stage 
Hill was part of the cast in the first public performance of Kenneth G. Ross's important Australian play Breaker Morant: A Play in Two Acts, presented by the Melbourne Theatre Company at the Melbourne Athenaeum on 2 February 1978.

Performance works
Hill has produced performance works for radio, including Desert Canticles, that premiered on ABC Radio on 5 February 2001. Hill is quoted as saying the piece was inspired by the following:
"Desert Canticles arises out of a marriage, a decade of travelling, and some years writing the literary biography of T.G.H. Strehlow out of Central Australia. I was writing my own poems out of love and the landscape, while trying to fathom Strehlow's great achievement in Songs of Central Australia. So the notion of translation as a metaphor for relationship – with place, with others, and with songs of different cultures (Hebraic, Buddhist, and Aboriginal) became a natural one upon which to thread a radio work."

Awards
 1991 New South Wales Premier's Literary Awards Douglas Stewart Prize for non-fiction, for Sitting In
 1994 New South Wales Premier's Literary Awards Kenneth Slessor Prize for Poetry for Ghosting William Buckley
 2003 Victorian Premier's Literary Award Non-Fiction award for Broken Song: T G H Strehlow and Aboriginal Possession
 2004 New South Wales Premier's Literary Awards NSW Premier's Biennial Prize for Literary Scholarship for Broken Song: T.G.H. Strehlow and Aboriginal Possession
 2004 Victorian Premier's Literary Award, the Alfred Deakin Prize for an Essay Advancing Public Debate for The Mood We're In: circa Australia Day 2004
 2004 National Biography Award for Broken Song: T G H Strehlow and Aboriginal Possession
 2004 Tasmania Pacific Bicentenary History Award for Broken Song: T G H Strehlow and Aboriginal Possession
 2005 Victorian Community History Awards for Best Print/Publication, with and the Borough of Queenscliffe, for The Enduring Rip: A History of Queenscliffe
 2012 Shortlisted for 2012 Forward Prize for Naked Clay

Personal life
(As of 2006) Hill is married to Rose Bygrave, a member of the band Goanna.

Bibliography
Poetry
 Raft: Poems 1983–1990 (Penguin, 1990)
 Ghosting William Buckley (Heinemann, 1993)
 The Inland Sea (Salt Publishing, 2001)
 Necessity: Poems 1996–2006 (soi3 modern poets, 2007)
 As We Draw Ourselves (Five Islands Press, 2008)
 Lines for Birds (UWA, 2011)
 Naked Clay (Shearsman, 2012)
 Kind Fire (Arcadia, 2020)

Short stories
 A Rim of Blue (McPhee Gribble, 1978)
 Headlocks & Other Stories (McPhee Gribble, 1983)

Novels
 The Schools (Penguin, 1977)
 Near the Refinery (McPhee Gribble, 1980)
 The Best Picture (McPhee Gribble, 1988)

Non-fiction
 Sitting In (Heinemann, 1991)
 The Rock: Travelling to Uluru (Allen & Unwin, 1994)
 The Enduring Rip: A History of Queenscliffe (MUP, 2004)

Essays
 The Mood We're In: circa Australia Day 2004. Overland 77.

Biography
 Broken Song: T G H Strehlow and Aboriginal Possession (Knopf-Random House 2002)

Libretti
 The Dark (Southern Cross University – University Library Lismore  collection, 1999)
 Desert Canticles, Veronica Dobson (performer), Elena Kats-Chernin (composer) (Australian Music Centre, 2001)
 Song of Songs, music by Andrew Schultz (Australian Music Centre)
 Love Strong as Death: a New Song of Songs, composer Andrew Schultz, performed at 'The Studio', The Sydney Opera House, May 2004

Political philosophy
 Peacemongers 2014

References

Sources

Further reading
 Review of Lines for birds.

1943 births
Living people
Alumni of the University of London
Poets from Melbourne
Australian historians
Australian biographers
Male biographers
Australian journalists
Australian male short story writers
Australian opera librettists
Academic staff of the University of Melbourne
University of Melbourne alumni
Australian male poets
Australian male dramatists and playwrights
20th-century Australian poets
20th-century Australian dramatists and playwrights
21st-century Australian dramatists and playwrights
21st-century Australian poets
20th-century Australian male writers